Barbara Davis Rae CBE RA FRSE (born 10 December 1943) is a Scottish painter and printmaker.  She is a member of the Royal Scottish Academy and the Royal Academy of Arts.

Biography
Rae studied painting at the Edinburgh College of Art from 1961 to 1965. As a student, she worked as a grouse-beater in the Scottish Highlands.  "I loved being up there walking the hills, seeing the landscape, drawing it," Rae said in a 2013 interview.  "Geography was really important to me and it still plays a huge role in my art."  After graduating, Rae received a travel scholarship that allowed her to spend time painting in France and Spain.  That experience and her later travel shaped her art, which largely focuses on landscapes.  She exhibited in her first solo show in 1967 at the Edinburgh's New 57 Gallery.  During her early career, she taught art at Ainslie Park School in Edinburgh (1968–69), Portobello High School (1969-1972), and the Aberdeen College of Education (1972–74).  In 1975, she became a lecturer in drawing and painting at the Glasgow School of Art, where she worked until 1996.

During this time, Rae exhibited regularly and received many awards for her artwork.  In 1980, she was elected as an Associate of the Royal Scottish Academy; she became a full member in 1992.  In 1983, she was elected president of the Society of Scottish Artists.  She was appointed as a member of the Royal Fine Art Commission for Scotland in 1995.  Rae also became a member of the Royal Academy of Art in 1996.  In 1999, she was awarded a Commander of the Order of the British Empire. She is also a Royal Etcher, a Fellow of the Royal College of Art, and an Honorary Fellow of the Royal Society of Edinburgh.

Rae's work is held by institutions including the University of Edinburgh, University of Glasgow, British Museum, National Museum of Women in the Arts, and Whitworth Art Gallery.   The first monograph on her work was in its third printing as of 2013.

Rae has homes in Scotland, Los Angeles, and France and often travels elsewhere in Europe and the southwest United States.
She is married to Gareth Wardell.

Style

The Royal Academy of Arts' magazine RA has described Rae's works as "intense colour bursts that evoke dramatic landscapes but remain resolutely abstract", "distil[ling] the colour, light and forms of nature into dazzling visions".  Rather than mixing paints on a palette, Rae applies unmixed acrylic paints to the canvas itself and then pours fluid over them to blend them.  The bright colors of her paintings and prints diverge from the typical colors of Scottish art.  Rae has said that she does not regard herself as a Scottish artist, though her "relationship with the landscape and history of the west coast of Scotland" has inspired much of her art.

Subject matter for her prints tend to the socio-political, her main interest in whatever has been shaped by the hand of man or woman, and weathered by age: an old Irish farmhouse, a door or fence gate, an ancient standing stone, a terrace of vines.

Rae's travel has greatly influenced her art.  Beginning in the 1960s, Rae travelled extensively in Spain, Ireland, France, and the southwest United States.  These travels "generated a body of work which indicated a deep interest in the history as well as the aesthetics of landscape".

Rae has said of her approach to her subjects, "I'm not interested in topographical detail. I need to be able to immerse myself in the culture of a place to create art."

Awards and honors
Scottish Arts Council Award (1975)
Guthrie Medal (Royal Scottish Academy) (1977)
Scottish Arts Council Award (1981)
Calouste Gulbenkian Printmaking Award (1983)
Sir William Gillies Travel Award (Royal Scottish Academy) (1983)
May Marshall Brown Award (The Royal Scottish Society of Painters in Watercolour) (1983)
Scottish Arts Council grant (1989)
Hunting Group Prize (1990)
Alexander Graham Munro Award (The Royal Scottish Society of Painters in Watercolour)
Commander of the Order of the British Empire
Honorary doctorate, Napier University (2002)
Honorary doctorate, Aberdeen University
Honorary fellowship, Royal College of Art (2008)
Honorary doctorate, University of St Andrews
Elected a Fellow of Royal Society of Edinburgh (2011)

Solo exhibitions

1967 - New 57 Gallery, Edinburgh
1977 - Gilbert Parr Gallery, London
1978 - University of Edinburgh
1979 - The Scottish Gallery, Edinburgh
1983 - The Scottish Gallery, Edinburgh
1985 - Wright Gallery, Dallas, Texas, USA
1986 - Leinster Fine Art, London
1987 - The Scottish Gallery, London
1988 - Glasgow Print Studio
1989 - The Scottish Gallery, Edinburgh
1990 - Landmarks and Docklands, The Scottish Gallery, London
1991 - The Scottish Gallery, London
1992 - Perth Museum and Art Gallery
1992 - Earth Pattern, William Jackson Gallery, London
1993 - New Monotypes and Prints, Glasgow Print Studio
1993 - The Reconstructed Landscape, Highland Regional Council, touring the North of Scotland
1994 - Jorgensen Fine Art, Dublin
1994 - Theatre Andre Dumas, Germain-en-Laye
1994 - The Reconstructed Landscape, Harewood House, Leeds
1995 - Art First, London
1995 - The Scottish Gallery, Edinburgh
1996 - Jorgensen Fine Art, Dublin
1996 - Art First, London
1996 - Waxlander Gallery, Santa Fe, New Mexico, USA
1996 - Bohun Gallery, Henley-on-Thames
1997 - New Paintings, (The South Africa Series), Art First, London

1998 - The Scottish Gallery, Edinburgh
1998 - Edinburgh The Festival City, Galleri Galtung, Oslo 
1999 - The Painted Desert, Art First, London
2000 - West, The Scottish Gallery, Edinburgh
2001 - Zuma Beach, Art First, London
2002 - Paintings from Ireland, Art First, London
2003 - Travelog, Glasgow Print Studio
2003 - an-tiarthar – the West, The Scottish Gallery, Edinburgh
2004 - Print Exhibition, North House Gallery, Essex
2004 - New Paintings, The Tom Caldwell Gallery, Belfast
2005 - Barbara Rae Monotypes, The Scottish Gallery
2005 - Print Exhibition, North House Gallery, Essex
2005 - New Paintings, Adam Gallery, London & Bath
2006 - Sierra - New Paintings from Spain, The Scottish Gallery, Edinburgh
2008 - New Paintings, Adam Gallery, London & Bath
2009 - Vignettes from Ireland, Adam Gallery, London
2009 - Recent Paintings, Richmond Hill Gallery, London
2010 - Barbara Rae RA: Prints, Sir Hugh Casson Room, Royal Academy, London
2010 - Celtic Connections Adam Gallery, London
2014 - University of St Andrews, Glasgow
2016 - Portland Gallery, London
2018 - Barbara Rae: The Northwest Passage - The Royal Scottish Academy of Art and Architecture
2018 - Barbara Rae: The Northwest Passage with Inuit sculpture from the Belle Shenkman Collection - Canada Gallery, Canada House, London

References

Further reading

External links
Official site
 

1943 births
Living people
20th-century British printmakers
21st-century British printmakers
20th-century Scottish painters
21st-century Scottish painters
20th-century Scottish women artists
21st-century Scottish women artists
Alumni of the Edinburgh College of Art
Commanders of the Order of the British Empire
People from Falkirk
Presidents of the Society of Scottish Artists
Royal Academicians
Royal Scottish Academicians
Scottish printmakers
Scottish women painters
Women printmakers